Santa Clara (also known as Las Villas after 1940) was a historical province of Cuba and its capital was Santa Clara. After 1976, its territory was divided into the modern Cuban provinces of Villa Clara, Cienfuegos and Sancti Spíritus.

Overview
The province was split up in 1976, with the administrative re-adjustment proclaimed by Cuban Law Number 1304 of July 3, 1976.

References

Further reading

External links

 Province webpage

Former provinces of Cuba
1900s establishments in Cuba
1976 disestablishments in Cuba
Cienfuegos Province
Sancti Spíritus Province
Villa Clara Province
 States and territories established in 1879